Thomas Anthony Finnegan (26 August 1925 – 25 December 2011) was the Bishop of Killala, County Mayo, Ireland from 1987 to 2002.

Thomas Anthony Finnegan was born on 26 August 1925, in Castlerea, County Roscommon. He was educated at Runamoat National School and then Summerhill College. He studied for the priesthood in Maynooth College and was ordained priest for the diocese of Elphin in 1951.

He served first as Chaplain at St Angela's College, Sligo before undertaking postgraduate studies in Education and Canon Law.

In 1960 he became Junior Dean at St Patrick's College, Maynooth, and while ambitious to serve longer at the National Seminary was recalled in  1966 to become President of Summerhill College. He served 13 years as president transforming much within the college and earning a reputation as a committed, pioneering educator.

In 1979, he was appointed to be Director of the Marriage Tribunal in Galway which adjudicated on annulments In 1982, he became parish priest of Roscommon town and Vicar General.

Bishop
In July 1987 he succeeded Bishop Thomas McDonnell as Bishop of Killala.  He was a founder member of the Council for the West along with the other west of Ireland bishops.

In 1998 Bishop Finnegan founded the Newman Institute which offers courses in counseling, theology and spirituality. Also in 2002, Finnegan was succeeded by Monsignor John Fleming. Bishop Finnegan celebrated his Diamond Jubilee in 2011.

Death
He died in Sligo General hospital on Christmas Day 2011, aged 86, and was buried in the grounds of Saint Muredach's Cathedral, Ballina.

See also
 Bishop of Killala

References

1925 births
2011 deaths
Alumni of St Patrick's College, Maynooth
People from County Roscommon
Religious leaders from County Mayo
Roman Catholic bishops of Killala